Pattie Fotheringhame, née Lewis (c. 1864 – 1955), commonly referred to as Mrs J. Fotheringhame, was a journalist in Sydney, Australia, who wrote for The Bulletin as "Mab". She has been described as Sydney's first woman journalist.

History  
Fotheringhame was a daughter of James Lewis ( – ) and Mary Ann Lewis (c. 1819 – 23 August 1894) of Escrick Park, near York, England.

She began her writing career with children's stories for the Sydney Mail, and was invited to join the staff of that paper, but accepted a counter-offer by her brother-in-law W. H. Traill to join the Sydney Bulletin, of which he was editor and part-owner.
Her first assignment, as an inexperienced 17 year old, was as founding editor of the "Women's Letter" society column, under the byline "Mab" in 1881, in competition with  Mrs. Gullett's page in The Daily Telegraph.

Working at the Bulletin brought her into contact with many of Australia's leading writers and artists: Henry Lawson, Harold "The Pilgrim" Grey, Victor Daley and George Augustus Sala.

She left journalism after marrying James Fotheringhame, introducing as her replacement the vivacious Ina Wildman who, writing as "Sappho Smith", had an illustrious career before dying of nephritis.

Around 1891 she purchased the children's monthly magazine Young Australia from Louisa Lawson (mother of Henry Lawson), and ran it for 20 years with Josephine Fotheringhame, her sister-in-law, as editor. Farmers' and Settlers' Publishing Co., Ltd, purchased the title in 1910.

Around 1900 she purchased another monthly publication of more universal appeal, Splashes, which she edited, and by 1902 was being praised for its content and production values. She sold the title to Hollander and Govett after 13 years, but stayed on as editor. Mary Grant Bruce contributed Melbourne social news. The paper, which at some stage began fortnightly publication, closed in 1917 due to wartime shortages.

In March 1918 she began working for a new magazine, Ladies' Sphere.

Other interests
Fotheringhame, an amateur photographer, was given equipment for photo-engraving by her brother-in-law Traill, who brought it back from America. She was successful in creating high quality zinc printing blocks from photographic negatives, so has been recognised as Australia's pioneer of the process.

Family
Pattie Lewis married Commander James Fotheringhame, R.N.R. (1856 – 3 April 1935) on 8 September 1886. He was eldest son of Ralph Fotheringhame, of Lynnfield House, Kirkwall, Orkney. Their children included:
Ralph Gilderoy Hepburn Fotheringhame (11 October 1890 – 25 May 1960) married Marcia Broadhurst on 28 February 1915
Mab Traill Fotheringhame (15 August 1887 – 1 May 1961) married Reg M. Harrison c. 1912.

They had a home "Cliffside", at Watsons Bay, New South Wales and later at "Mohaka", 68 Louisa Road, Long Nose Point, Sydney

Her sisters included Susanna Ascot Lewis (died 18 June 1920); Jessie Lewis (c. 1843–1867); and Agnes Lewis (c. 1855 –  17 May 1930), these last two being married to W. H. Traill. John Joseph Lewis, possibly (1860 – 22 October 1946) was a brother.

Her sister-in-law, Josephine Fotheringham (c. 1854 – 13 September 1945), who was born in Orkney, wrote articles for Chambers' Journal.

References 

1864 births
1955 deaths
Australian women journalists
Australian women editors
19th-century Australian journalists
20th-century Australian journalists
Australian magazine publishers (people)
Australian magazine editors
20th-century Australian women